KEAU may refer to:

 KEAU (FM), a radio station (104.7 FM) licensed to serve Elko, Nevada, United States
 Chippewa Valley Regional Airport (ICAO code KEAU)